Hypotrachyna guatemalensis is a species of foliose lichen in the family Parmeliaceae. Found in Guatemala, it was described as new to science in 2011.

References

guatemalensis
Lichen species
Lichens described in 2011
Lichens of Central America
Taxa named by John Alan Elix